John Hore (fl.1642–1691) was an Irish Jacobite politician.

Hore was the elder son of Matthew Hore. In 1689 he was appointed High Sheriff of County Waterford. The same year he was elected as a Member of Parliament for Dungarvan in the Patriot Parliament summoned by James II of England. He was attainted in 1691 for his support for Jacobitism.

He married Catherine Bourke, daughter of Sir John Bourke of Derrymaclachtney and granddaughter of Richard Burke, 6th Earl of Clanricarde.

References

Year of birth unknown
Year of death unknown
17th-century Irish people
High Sheriffs of County Waterford
Irish Jacobites
Irish MPs 1689
Members of the Parliament of Ireland (pre-1801) for County Waterford constituencies
People convicted under a bill of attainder